Yeshe is a Tibetan term meaning wisdom and is analogous to jnana in Sanskrit. The word appears for example in the title of the Lamrim Yeshe Nyingpo, a Vajrayana Buddhist sacred scripture that records oral teachings of Padmasambhava in the 9th century, and in the name of Yeshe Walmo, a deity of the Tibetan religion of Bon. It is used as a unisex given name by Tibetans and Bhutanese people, also spelled Yeshey, Yeshay, or Yeshi.

People with this name include:

Religious figures
Yeshe De (Jnanasutra), a Tibetan Vajrayana Dzogchenpa who was a disciple of Sri Singha
Yeshe Tsogyal (757–817), a semi-mythical female deity or figure of enlightenment (dakini) in Tibetan Buddhism
Nubchen Sangye Yeshe (9th century), one of the twenty-five principal students of Guru Padmasambhava
Yeshe-Ö (c. 959–1040), the first notable lama-king in Tibet
Yeshe Rinchen (1248–1294), Imperial Preceptor (Dishi) of the Yuan dynasty
Lobsang Yeshe, 5th Panchen Lama (1663–1737)
Yeshe Dorje (1676–1702), the eleventh Gyalwa Karmapa, head of the Kagyu School of Tibetan Buddhism
Lobsang Palden Yeshe, 6th Panchen Lama (1738–1780), of Tashilhunpo Monastery in Tibet
Thubten Yeshe (1935–1984), Tibetan lama who, while exiled in Nepal, co-founded Kopan Monastery
Yeshe Losal Rinpoche (born 1943), lama in the Kagyu school of Tibetan Buddhism, abbott of the Samye Ling Monastery, Scotland

Politicians
Sanggyai Yexe (1917–2008), Chinese Communist Party official
Yeshey Zimba (born 1952), Bhutanese politician, former Prime Minister
Yeshey Penjor (born ), Bhutanese politician
Yeshey Dem, Bhutanese politician

Sportspeople
Yeshey Gyeltshen (born 1983), Bhutanese footballer
Yeshey Dorji (born 1989), Bhutanese footballer

Other
Yeshi Dhonden (1927–2019), practitioner of Tibetan traditional medicine
Yeshe Dorjee Thongchi (born 1952), Indian writer from Arunachal Pradesh
Yeshe Choesang (born 1974), India-based journalist

References

Tibetan names